Kim Sang-kyum (born January 30, 1989 in Cheorwon) is a South Korean snowboarder, specializing in Alpine snowboarding.

Kim competed at the 2014 Winter Olympics for South Korea. He placed 17th in qualifying for the parallel giant slalom and 26th parallel slalom, not advancing in either event.

As of September 2014, his best showing at the World Championships is 23rd, in the 2013 parallel giant slalom.

Kim made his World Cup debut in October 2009. As of September 2014, his best finish is 21st in parallel slalom at Yongpyong in 2010–11. His best overall finish was 46th, in 2010–11.

Education
2011 Korea National Sport University
2007 Bongpyung High School

References

External links

1989 births
Living people
Olympic snowboarders of South Korea
Snowboarders at the 2014 Winter Olympics
Snowboarders at the 2018 Winter Olympics
Snowboarders at the 2022 Winter Olympics
Sportspeople from Gangwon Province, South Korea
South Korean male snowboarders
Korea National Sport University alumni
Asian Games medalists in snowboarding
Snowboarders at the 2017 Asian Winter Games
Asian Games bronze medalists for South Korea
Medalists at the 2017 Asian Winter Games
Universiade gold medalists for South Korea
Universiade medalists in snowboarding
Competitors at the 2011 Winter Universiade
21st-century South Korean people